Parornix oculata is a moth of the family Gracillariidae. It is known from Greece and Turkey.

References

Parornix
Moths of Europe
Moths of Asia
Moths described in 1979